Christoph Bartsch is a German bobsledder who competed in the late 1990s. He won a silver medal in the four-man event at the 1997 FIBT World Championships in St. Moritz.

References
Bobsleigh four-man world championship medalists since 1930

German male bobsledders
Living people
Year of birth missing (living people)